Luxembourg competed at the 2012 Winter Youth Olympics in Innsbruck, Austria. The Luxembourgish team was made up of one athlete and three officials. Ferand Guth was the Chef De Mission of the team.

Alpine skiing

Luxembourg qualified one girl in alpine skiing.

Girl

See also
Luxembourg at the 2012 Summer Olympics

References

2012 in Luxembourgian sport
Nations at the 2012 Winter Youth Olympics
Luxembourg at the Youth Olympics